Takeminakata (タケミナカタ), also known as Minakatatomi or Takeminakatatomi, is a kami in Japanese mythology. Takeminakata was also held to be the mythical ancestor of certain families who once served at the shrine as priests, foremost among them being the Suwa clan, the high priests of the Upper Shrine of Suwa who were also revered as living vessels of the god.

Whereas in the Kojiki (ca. 712 CE) and later derivative accounts, Takeminakata appears as one of the sons of the god Ōkuninushi who fled to Lake Suwa after being defeated by the warrior god Takemikazuchi, other myths (mostly of medieval origin) instead offer alternative explanations regarding the god of Suwa Shrine's origins and identity, portraying him either as an interloper who conquered Suwa by defeating the local kami, as a king from India who manifested in Japan, or as a snake or dragon deity.

Name

The god is named 'Takeminakata-no-Kami' in both the Kojiki (ca. 712 CE) and the Sendai Kuji Hongi (ca. 807-936 CE). Variants of the name found in the imperially commissioned national histories and other literary sources include the following:

 Minakatatomi-no-Kami (南方刀美神)
 Minakatatomi-no-Mikoto-no-Kami (御名方富命神)
 Takeminakatatomi-no-Mikoto (健御名方富命 / 建御名方富命)
 Takeminakatatomi-no-Mikoto-no-Kami (建御名方富命神)

The etymology of the name '(Take)minakata(tomi)' is unclear. While most commentators seem to agree that take- (and probably -tomi) are honorifics, they differ in how to interpret the other components of the name. Some of the proposed solutions are as follows.

The Edo period kokugaku scholar Motoori Norinaga explained both take- (建) and mi- (御) as honorifics (称名 tatae-na), with kata (方) as yet another tatae-na meaning "hard" or "firm" (堅). Basil Chamberlain followed Motoori's lead and rendered the god's name as 'Brave-August-Name-Firm' in his translation of the Kojiki.
Ōta Akira (1926) interpreted take-, mi- and -tomi as honorifics and took Nakata (名方) to be a place name: Nakata District (名方郡) in Awa Province (modern Ishii, Tokushima Prefecture), where Takeminatomi Shrine (多祁御奈刀弥神社) stands. Ōwa Iwao (1990) explains the similarity between 'Takeminakata(tomi)' and 'Takeminatomi' by proposing that the name may have been brought to Suwa by immigrants from Nakata in Awa.
Minakata has also been linked to the Munakata (宗像) of Kyushu. Matsuoka Shizuo (1936) interpreted Minakatatomi as originally being a goddess – citing the fact that the deities of Munakata shrine were female – that was later conflated with the male god Takeminakata.
Another explanation proposes minakata to mean "south(ern)" (南方). A variant of this hypothesis sees the name as hinting at a connection between the god and metalworking, in which the southern direction is important: Mayumi Tsunetada (1981) for instance proposed that Takeminakata's name refers to the southern pillar of a takadono (a high-roofed house housing a tatara furnace). Gustav Heldt's translation of the Kojiki (2014), where the name is translated as 'Brave Southward Smelter', follows this interpretation.
Yet another theory interprets mi(na)- to mean "water" (水), pointing to the god being a water deity perhaps associated with Lake Suwa. The full name is thought to derive from a word denoting a body of water or a waterside region such as 水潟 (minakata, "lagoon" or "inlet") or 水県 (mi(na)- "water" + agata "country(side)").
An alternative explanation for the word -tomi (as well as the -tome in 'Yasakatome', the name of this god's consort) is to link it with dialectal words for "snake" (tomi, tobe, or tōbe), thereby seeing the name as hinting to the god being a kind of serpentine water deity (mizuchi).

Suwa Daimyōjin

During the medieval and early modern periods, the god enshrined in Suwa Grand Shrine – specifically, in the Upper Shrine (Kamisha) located southeast of Lake Suwa – was popularly known as Suwa Daimyōjin ( / 諏方大明神) or Suwa Myōjin, a name also applied via metonymy to the shrine itself. The name '(Take)minakata(tomi)' was rarely used, if at all, during this period: indeed, medieval documents from Suwa Shrine simply refer to the god as sonshin / sonjin (尊神, "revered deity") or myōjin (明神, "bright deity" or "manifest deity"). This however is hardly unusual, as before the early modern period use of titles such as myōjin or gongen for various gods and their shrines were so widespread that these deities were rarely referred to by their classical names.

Other epithets applied to the Suwa deity include Nangū Daimyōjin (南宮大明神, "Daimyōjin of the Southern Shrine (Nangū)"), Hosshō Daimyōjin (法性大明神, "Dharma-Nature Daimyōjin"), a combination of the two such as Nangū Hosshō Daimyōjin (南宮法性大明神), or Suwa Hosshō Kamishimo (or Jōge) Daimyōjin (諏訪法性上下大明神, "Dharma-Nature Daimyōjin of the Upper and Lower Suwa [Shrines]"). Some of the war banners used by Sengoku daimyō Takeda Shingen (a devotee of the god) for instance contain the inscription Suwa Nangū Hosshō Kamishimo / Jōge Daimyōjin (諏訪南宮法性上下大明神 / 諏方南宮法性上下大明神). A hanging scroll given by Emperor Go-Nara (reigned 1526–1557) to the Upper Shrine in 1553 (Tenbun 22), written in the emperor's own calligraphy, refers to the god as Suwa Shōichii Nangū Hossho Daimyōjin (諏方正一位南宮法性大明神, "Dharma-Nature Daimyōjin of the Suwa Nangū, of Upper First Rank").

A number of explanations have been proposed for the origin of the term Nangū. One theory posits it to refer to the geographical location of the Upper Suwa Shrine, which is located southeast of Lake Suwa, at the southern half of Shinano Province, while another claims it to be derived from 'Minakatatomi' (南方刀美), one of the variant names for the deity, with minakata being apparently understood to mean "south(ern)" (cf. etymology of 'Takeminakata' above). Indeed, certain copies of the 'Register of Deities' (神名帳, Jinmyōchō) section of the Engishiki, in which this form of the name is used, include reading glosses (furigana) suggesting that 南方 was read during the medieval period as nanpō, the characters' Sino-Japanese reading. The term has also been interpreted to come from the medieval belief that the Suwa deity was the guardian of the south side of the imperial palace or the Shinto-Buddhist concept that the god is an enlightened being who manifested in the world of men, which in Buddhist cosmology is the southern continent of Jambudvīpa.

Aside from Suwa Shrine, Nangū was also applied to Kanayamahiko Shrine in Mino Province (modern Nangū Taisha in Gifu Prefecture) and Aekuni Shrine (南宮大菩薩, Nangū Daibosatsu) in Iga Province (modern Mie Prefecture). A song in the late Heian period anthology Ryōjin Hishō associates the three shrines together, with Suwa Shrine being identified as the "head" of the three Nangū shrines (南宮の本山, nangu no honzan), the shrine at Mino as the "midmost shrine" (中の宮, naka no miya), and the shrine at Iga as the "youngest shrine" (稚の宮, chigo no miya).

Hosshō, meanwhile, is believed to refer to the concept of the dharmakāya (法性身, hosshōshin), the formless, transcendent ultimate truth that is the source of all buddhas, which are its physical manifestations (nirmāṇakāya). A certain medieval legend claims that the Suwa deity chose an eight-year-old boy to become his priest while declaring: "I have no (physical) body and so make this priest my body".

Mythology

In classical mythology

Parentage
Takeminakata is portrayed in both the Kojiki and the Sendai Kuji Hongi as a son of the god Ōkuninushi, although the former does not include him in its genealogy of Ōkuninushi's children. The Kuji Hongi meanwhile identifies him as the son of Ōnamuchi (Ōkuninushi) with one of his wives, Nunakawahime of Koshi.

Bout with Takemikazuchi

Takeminakata appears in both the Kojiki and the Kuji Hongi in the context of Ōkuninushi's "transfer of the land" (kuni-yuzuri) to the amatsukami, the gods of the heavenly realm of Takamagahara.

When the heavenly deities, headed by the sun goddess Amaterasu and/or the primordial deity Takamimusubi, sent Takemikazuchi and another messenger to demand that Ōkuninushi relinquish his authority over the earthly realm of Ashihara no Nakatsukuni (the "Central Land of Reed-Plains") to Amaterasu's progeny, he told the messengers to consult his son Kotoshironushi, who immediately accepted their demands and advised his father to do likewise. Upon being asked if he had any other sons who ought to express their opinion, Ōkuninushi told the messengers that he had another son named Takeminakata.

As he was saying this, this same Takeminakata-no-Kami came bearing a tremendous boulder (千引之石, chibiki no iwa, i.e. a boulder so large it would take a thousand men to pull) on his finger-tips and said:

"Who is it who has come to our land and is talking so furtively? Come, let us test our strength; I will first take your arm."

When [Takemikazuchi-no-Kami] allowed [Takeminakata-no-Kami] to take his arm, he changed it into a column of ice, then again changed it into a sword blade. At this, he (Takeminakata) was afraid and drew back.

Then [Takemikazuchi-no-Kami], in his turn, demanded [the right] to take hold of the arm of Takeminakata-no-Kami.

When he took it, it was like taking hold of a young reed; he grasped it and crushed it, throwing it aside. Immediately, he (Takeminakata) ran away.

They pursued him, and caught up with him by the lake of Suwa in the land of Shinano (科野国州羽海). As they were about to kill him, Takeminakata-no-Kami said:

"Pray do not kill me. I will go to no other place. Also I will not disobey the commands of my father, Ōkuninushi-no-Kami, and will not disobey the words of the words of Yae-Kotoshironushi-no-Kami. I will yield this Central Land of the Reed Plains in accordance with the commands of the Heavenly Deities."

With Takeminakata's surrender, Ōkuninushi finally agreed to cede the land to the amatsukami and withdrew himself into the unseen spirit world.

Variants 

The opening section of the Suwa Daimyōjin Ekotoba, a medieval compilation of legends and other information regarding Suwa Shrine, its deity and its festivals, retells the Kuji Hongi version of this story, albeit with Takeminakata's shameful defeat notably omitted. This is believed to be an editorial decision by the compiler, Suwa (Kosaka) Enchū (a member of a cadet branch of the Suwa clan based in Kyoto), to portray Takeminakata in a more honorable light.

It is said in the Kuji Hongi that Amaterasu-Ōmikami gave a decree and sent two gods, Futsunushi-no-Kami (of Katori Shrine in Sōshū) and Takeikatsuchi-no-Kami (of Kashima Shrine in Jōshū), down to the land of Izumo, where they declared to Ōanamuchi (of Kitsuki in Unshū [and] Miwa in Washū), "The Central Land of Reed-Plains is the land entrusted to our heir. Are you willing to give it up to the heavenly deities?"
Ōanamuchi said, "Ask my son, Kotoshironushi-no-Kami (of Nagata Shrine in Sesshū; eighth [patron deity of] the Jingi-kan); he will give you an answer."Kotoshironushi-no-Kami said, "My father ought respectfully to withdraw, nor will I disobey."[The messengers said,] "Do you have any other sons who ought to speak?""There is also my son, Takeminakata-no-Kami (of Suwa Shrine)."[He] came, bearing a heavy boulder on his fingertips, saying, "Who is it who has come to our land and is talking so furtively? I wish to challenge you to a test of strength."

When he took his hand, it turned into an icicle, and then it turned into a sword blade (or "he caused ice to appear, and then he took up a sword"). Upon arriving at the sea of Suwa in the land of Shinano, Takeminakata-no-Kami said, "I will go to no other place."

This is the story of [the deity's] manifestation (垂迹の本縁 suijaku no hon'en).

Similar attempts at retelling or reinterpreting the myth in a more positive way are found in certain later versions of the story. In one version, for instance, Takeminakata is portrayed as going to Suwa not so much to flee from Takemikazuchi but to pacify it under the orders of his father Ōkuninushi.

A variant found in a commentary on the Nihon Shoki penned by a 15th-century monk named Shun'yu (春瑜), the Nihon Shoki Shikenmon (日本書紀私見聞), claims 'Suwa Daimyōjin' (諏防大明神) to be the third son of the deity Sannō Gongen, the guardian deity of Mount Hiei. After engaging in a failed rebellion against Amaterasu, the deity surrendered and settled down in the land of Shinano.

Local legends from within Nagano Prefecture claim Takeminakata to have passed or stayed in various places within the region during his escape. A local legend in Shimoina District (located south of Suwa) for instance claims that Takemikazuchi caught up with the fleeing Takeminakata in the modern village of Toyooka, where they agreed to an armistice and left imprints of their hands on a rock as a sign of their agreement. The rock, bearing the gods' supposed handprints (tegata), is found in Otegata Shrine (御手形神社) in Toyooka. After Takemikazuchi's departure, Takeminakata temporarily resided in the neighboring village of Ōshika, where he discovered hot springs of saltwater whilst hunting for deer.

The contest between Takemikazuchi and Takeminakata has also been sometimes interpreted as an origin myth for sumo wrestling and aiki. This interpretation apparently follows an alternative reading of the text which sees Takemikazuchi as not so much crushing and tearing Takeminakata's arm(s) off but seizing him by the arm and throwing him into the ground.

In later mythology

Entry into Suwa

A myth from the Suwa area portrays Suwa Myōjin as being opposed during his advent by the local god Moriya (Moreya).

A document supposedly submitted to the Kamakura shogunate in 1249 by Suwa Nobushige, then high priest or Ōhōri (大祝) of the Upper Shrine of Suwa, known as the Suwa Nobushige Gejō (諏訪信重解状 "The Petition of Suwa Nobushige"), relates a story from "the ancient customs" (舊貫) that the Suwa deity came down from heaven in order to take possession of the land of 'Moriya Daijin' (守屋大臣). The conflict between the two escalated into a battle, but as no winner could be declared, the two finally compete in a tug of war using hooks (kagi): Suwa Myōjin, using a hook made out of the wisteria plant (藤鎰), emerges victorious against Moriya, who used an iron hook (鐵鎰). After his victory, the god built his dwelling (what would become the Upper Shrine) in Moriya's land and planted the wisteria hook, which became a grove known as the 'Forest of Fujisuwa' (藤諏訪之森 Fujisuwa no mori). Whereas the Kojiki portrays Takeminakata as an earthly god defeated by a deity from heaven, this myth notably features the opposite scenario, in which the deity of Suwa descends from heaven and conquers the land below.

The Suwa Daimyōjin Ekotoba relates a variant of this myth as an origin story of Fujishima Shrine (藤島社) in Suwa City, one of the Upper Shrine's auxiliary shrines where its yearly rice-planting ceremony is traditionally held. In this version, the deity of Fujishima Shrine (藤島の明神 Fujishima no Myōjin) - usually equated with Suwa Myōjin - defeats "Moriya the evil outlaw" (洩矢の惡賊, Moriya no akuzoku) with a wisteria branch:

Regarding the so-called 'Fujishima no Myōjin': long ago, when the revered deity (尊神 sonshin) manifested himself, Moriya the evil outlaw sought to hinder the god and fought him with an iron ring (鐵輪), but the Myōjin, taking up a wisteria branch (藤の枝), defeated him, thus finally subduing heresy (邪輪 jarin, lit. "wheel/circle/ring of evil") and establishing the true Dharma. When the Myōjin swore an oath and threw the wisteria branch away, immediately it took root [in the ground], its branches and leaves flourishing in abundance, and [sprouted] beautiful blossoms, leaving behind a marker of the battleground for posterity. Fujishima no Myōjin is named thus for this reason.Kanai (1982). p. 262.

Two extant medieval genealogies of the Suwa (Miwa) clan also begin by recounting the legend of a battle between the Suwa deity, accompanied by the first high priest of the Upper Shrine, and 'Moriya' (守屋) during the reign of Emperor Yōmei (585-587).

In later versions of this story which combine it with the kuni-yuzuri myth, Moriya opposes Takeminakata after the latter had fled from Izumo. After being defeated, Moriya swears fealty to Takeminakata and becomes a faithful ally. Moriya is reckoned as the divine ancestor of the Moriya (守矢) clan, one of the former priestly lineages of the Upper Shrine.

While medieval sources such as Nobushige's petition and the Ekotoba situate the battle between the two gods in the slopes of Mount Moriya somewhere in the vicinity of the Upper Shrine (modern Suwa City), a variant legend first attested in Edo period texts instead place it on the banks of the Tenryū River (modern Okaya City).

Apart from Moriya, a few scattered local legends make reference to other deities who either submitted to the Suwa deity or refused to do so. One such god that is said to have opposed Suwa Myōjin and his new ally Moriya in local folklore was Yatsukao-no-Mikoto (矢塚男命), also known as Ganigawara (蟹河原長者 Ganigawara-chōja).

The story relates that Ganigawara, a horse breeder who wielded great authority in the region, held Moriya in contempt for surrendering to Takeminakata and had messengers publicly harass him by calling him a coward. When Ganigawara's servants began to resort to violence by shooting arrows in Takeminakata's newly built house, Takeminakata retaliated by invading Ganigawara's turf. Mortally wounded by an arrow in the ensuing battle, Ganigawara begs forgiveness from Moriya and entrusts his youngest daughter to Takeminakata, who gives her in marriage to the god Taokihooi-no-Mikoto (手置帆負命) a.k.a. Hikosachi-no-Kami (彦狭知神), who was injured by Ganigawara's messengers as he was keeping watch over Takeminakata's abode.

In another legend, a god named Takei-Ōtomonushi (武居大伴主神 or 武居大友主神) swore allegiance to Takeminakata and became the ancestor of a line of priests in the Lower Shrine known as the Takeihōri (武居祝). Yet another story relates that the Suwa deity forbade the goddess of Sakinomiya Shrine (先宮神社) in Owa, Suwa City from building a bridge over the creek before her shrine as punishment for her refusal to submit to him.

The Ōhōri

Before the abolition of the Suwa Grand Shrine's traditional priestly offices during the Meiji period, the Upper Shrine of Suwa's high priest or Ōhōri (大祝  'great priest'; also Ōhafuri) was a young boy chosen from the Suwa clan, who was, during his term of office, considered to be a living god, the visible incarnation or 'body' of the unseen god of the shrine.

The legend of how Suwa Myōjin chose his first priest is recounted in various sources, such as the Suwa Daimyōjin Ekotoba:

At the beginning of the god's manifestation, he took off his robe, put them on an eight year old boy, and dubbed him 'great priest' (Ōhōri). The god declared, "I do not have a body and so make this priest (hōri) my body."
This [boy] is Arikazu (有員), the priest of the sacred robe (御衣祝 Misogihōri), the founding ancestor of the Miwa/Jin (神, i.e. Suwa) clan.

Although most sources (such as the Ekotoba above) identify the boy with the semi-legendary priest Arikazu, who is said to have lived in the 9th century (early Heian period) during the reign of Emperor Kanmu (781-806) or his immediate successors Heizei (806-809) or Saga (809-823), two genealogical lists - of disputed historical reliability - instead identify the first priest with an individual named Otoei (乙頴) or Kumako (神子 or 熊古), a son of Mase-gimi (麻背君) or Iotari (五百足), head of the Kanasashi clan and kuni no miyatsuko of Shinano during the late 6th century.

One of these two texts is a genealogy of the Aso (阿蘇) clan of Aso Shrine in Kyushu known as the 異本阿蘇氏系図 (Ihon Asoshi Keizu). It reads in part:

Otoei (Ōhōri of the great god of Suwa): also known as Kumako (神子) or Kumako (熊古).
When he was eight years old, the great god Minakatatomi-no-Mikoto appeared, took off his robe and put them on Kumako, declaring, "I do not have a body and so make you my body." In the third month of the second year of Iware Ikebe no Ōmiya (587), a sanctuary (社壇) was built at the foot of the mountain at the southern side of the lake (i.e. Lake Suwa) to worship the great god of Suwa and various other gods ...

The other is the Ōhōri-ke Jinshi Keizu (大祝家神氏系図), a genealogy of the Suwa clan discovered in the Ōhōri's residence in 1884 (Meiji 17). It portrays Arikazu as a descendant of Kumako, the priest chosen by Takeminakata:

When Kumako was eight years old, the revered deity appeared, took off his robe and put them on Kumako. After declaring, "I do not have a body and so make you my body," he disappeared. This [Kumako] is the ancestor of Arikazu of the Miwa/Jin (Suwa) clan, the Misogihōri. In the second year of Emperor Yōmei, Kumako built a sanctuary at the foot of the mountain at the southern side of the lake.

The King of Hadai
A medieval Buddhist legend portrays Suwa Myōjin as a king from India who later achieved enlightenment and went to Japan to become a native kami.

A short text attached to a late 15th century copy of an ordinance regulating the Upper Shrine's ritual purity taboos (物忌み monoimi) originally enforced in 1238 and revised in 1317, the Suwa Kamisha monoimi no rei no koto (諏訪上社物忌令之事), relates that 'Takeminakata Myōjin' (武御名方明神) was originally the ruler of a certain Indian kingdom called 'Hadai' (波堤国 Hadai-koku) who survived an insurrection instigated by a rebel named 'Moriya' (守屋 or 守洩) during the king's absence while the latter was out hunting deer. After going to Persia to rescue its inhabitants from an evil dragon, the king ruled over it for some time as 'Emperor Suwa' (陬波皇帝 Suwa Kōtei) before retiring to "cultivate the seedling of virtue and realize the Buddhist path." He eventually manifested in Japan, appearing in various places before finally choosing to dwell in Suwa.

The Suwa Daimyōjin Ekotoba relates a slightly different, fuller version of the first half of this story as an origin myth for the Upper Shrine's hunting ceremony held every seventh month of the year at Misayama (御射山) on the slopes of the Yatsugatake Mountains:

If one should inquire about the origins (因縁 in'en, lit. 'causes and conditions') of this hunt: long ago, the Daimyōjin was the king of the land of Hadai in India who went out to hunt at Deer Park from the twenty-seventh to the thirtieth day of the seventh month. At that time, a traitorous vassal named Bikyō (美教) suddenly organized an army and sought to kill the king. The king, ringing a golden bell, looked up to heaven and shouted eight times: "I am now about to be killed by this rebel. I have hunted animals, not for my own enjoyment, but in order to lead them to the Buddhist path. If this my action is in accordance with Heaven's will, may Brahmā save me."
Brahmā then saw this and commanded the four great deva-kings to wield vajra-poles and destroy the army. It is said that the Misayama (三齋山) of today reflects that event. ... One should know, therefore, that the deity's compassionate hunting is an expedient means for the salvation of creatures.

Regarding the Upper Shrine's hunting rituals, the Monoimi no rei asserts that

[The shrine's] hunts began in the deer park of Hadai-no-kuni [in India]. [The use of] hawks began in Magada-no-kuni.

The second half of the legend (the slaying of the dragon in Persia and the king's migration to Japan) is used by the Ekotoba's compiler, Suwa Enchū, in a liturgical text, the Suwa Daimyōjin Kōshiki (諏方大明神講式), where it is introduced as an alternative, if somewhat less credible, account of the Suwa deity's origins (in comparison to the myth of Takeminakata of Izumo as found in the Kuji Hongi, touted by the same text as the authoritative origin story of the god) that nevertheless should not be suppressed. In this text, the king of Hadai is claimed to be a great-great-grandson of King Siṃhahanu (獅子頬王 Shishikyō-ō), Gautama Buddha's grandfather. Bikyō, the rebel who raised up an army against the king in India - identified as an incarnation of the Demon King (魔王) - is also said to have eventually manifested in Japan, opposing the deity in Suwa as "Moriya the evil outlaw."

A similar account appears in a work known as the Suwa Jinja Engi (諏訪神社縁起) or Suwa Shintō Engi (諏訪神道縁起), wherein the Suwa deity is identified as the son of Kibonnō (貴飯王), the son of Amṛtodana (甘呂飯王 Kanrobonnō), one of Siṃhahanu's four sons. The Lower Shrine's goddess, meanwhile, is the daughter of Prasenajit (波斯匿王 Hashinoku-ō), claimed here to be the son of Dronodana (黒飯王 Kokubonnō), another son of Siṃhananu.

The Suwa Mishirushibumi

During the Misayama festival as performed during the medieval period, the Ōhōri recited a ritual declaration supposedly composed by the Suwa deity himself known as the Suwa Mishirushibumi (陬波御記文), which begins:

I, Great King Suwa (陬波大王), have hidden my person during [the year/month/day of] the Yang Wood Horse (甲午 kinoe-uma).
[The name] 'Suwa' (陬波) and [the sign] Yang Wood Horse [and] the seal (印文) - these three are all one and the same.

Within the text, King Suwa (i.e. Suwa Myōjin) declares the Ōhōri to be his 'true body' (真神体 shin no shintai) and the Misayama (三斎山) hunting grounds below Yatsugatake (here likened to Vulture Peak in India) to be another manifestation of himself that cleanses (斎) the three (三) evils: evil thoughts, evil speech and evil actions. He promises that whoever sets foot at Misayama will not fall into the lower, evil realms of existence (悪趣 akushu); conversely, the god condemns and disowns whoever defiles the hunting grounds by cutting down its trees or digging out the soil.

A commentary on the Mishirushibumi, the Suwa Shichū (陬波私注 "Personal Notes on the Suwa Mishirusibumi," written 1313–1314), elaborates on the text by retelling the legend of Suwa Myōjin's consecration of his first priest:

The Daimyōjin was born during [the year/month/day of] the Yang Wood Horse and disappeared during [the year/month/day of] the Yang Wood Horse.
Sokutan Daijin (続旦大臣) was the Daimyōjin's uncle who accompanied him from India. When the Daimyōjin was to disappear, he took off his garments, put them on the Daijin, and dubbed him the Misogihōri (御衣木法理). He then pronounced a vow: "You shall consider this priest to be my body."

The same text identifies the god's uncle Sokutan Daijin with Arikazu.

Suwa Myōjin and the frog god

Two texts, the Monoimi no rei and the Suwa Shichū (陬波私注 "Personal Notes on the Suwa Mishirusibumi," written 1313–1314), mention an oral legend about Suwa Myōjin pacifying the waves of the four seas by subduing an unruly frog god.

Suwa (陬波) should be read as "the waves are calm." When a frog god (蝦蟆神), being a harmful god (荒神 kōjin), caused suffering to the realm, the Daimyōjin quelled it and came to reside here; [because] the four seas were calm, it is called Suwa.

After defeating this frog, Suwa Myōjin then blocked the way to its dwelling - a hole leading to the underwater palace of the dragon god of the sea, the Ryūgū-jō - with a rock and sat on it.

This story functions as an etiological legend for the annual sacrifice of frogs held every New Year's Day in the Upper Shrine (see below) as well as yet another folk etymology for the toponym 'Suwa' (rendered here as 陬波), here explained as deriving either from a term for a wave lapping onto the sea's edge or a reference to the deity's pacification of the waters: "the waves are calm."

The portrayal of Suwa Myōjin's enemy as a frog also hints at the deity's character as a serpentine water god. (As a point of comparison, the obscure snake god Ugajin was also credited with defeating a malevolent frog deity.) The frog god itself has been interpreted either as representing the native deities Mishaguji and/or Moriya, with its defeat symbolizing the victory of the cult of Suwa Myōjin over the indigenous belief system, or as a symbol of the Buddhist concept of the three poisons (ignorance, greed, and hatred), which Suwa Myōjin, as an incarnation of the bodhisattva Samantabhadra, his esoteric aspect Vajrasattva and the Wisdom King Trailokyavijaya (interpreted as a manifestation of Vajrasattva), is said to destroy.

The dragon (serpent) deity of Suwa

Folk belief has long held the god of Suwa Shrine to assume the form of a serpent or dragon. Consequently, the deity appears as such in a number of folktales and anecdotes.

In one such story, Suwa Myōjin once came to Izumo Province in the form of a dragon so gigantic that only his head can be seen; his tail was still at Suwa, caught in a tall pine tree by the shores of the lake. The other gods, upon seeing him, were so astounded and frightened at his enormous size that they exempted him from attending their yearly meetings. Thus, the deity of Suwa is claimed to be one of the very few kami in Japan who do not leave their shrines during the month of Kannazuki, when most gods are thought to gather at Izumo and thus are absent from most of the country.

A variant of this story transposes the setting from Izumo to the Imperial Palace in Kyoto; in this version, the various kami are said to travel to the ancient capital every New Year's Day to greet the emperor.

Another popular story promulgated by wandering preachers associated with the shrines of Suwa during the medieval period claimed the Suwa deity to have originally been Kōga Saburō, a warrior who temporarily became a dragon or a snake after a journey into the underworld.

Omiwatari

Cracks and ridges that form on a frozen Lake Suwa during cold winters have traditionally been interpreted as the trail left behind by Suwa Myōjin as he leaves the Upper Shrine and crosses the lake to meet his wife enshrined on the Lower Shrine on the opposite (northern) shore. Called Omiwatari (御神渡 'the god's crossing' or 'the god's pathway'), the cracks were considered to be a good omen for the coming year. The priests of the Grand Shrine of Suwa traditionally used the crack's appearance to divine the quality of the year's harvest. For the locals, the crack also served as a sign that the frozen lake was safe to walk upon. Conversely, the omiwatari's failure to appear at all (明海 ake no umi) or the cracks forming in an unusual way were held to be a sign of bad luck for the year.

Since the late 20th century, the omiwatari has become a much rarer sight than it was in the past due to rising temperatures caused by global warming.

As god of war

Suwa Myōjin is also considered to be a god of war, one of a number of such deities in the Japanese pantheon. The Ryōjin Hishō compiled in 1179 (the late Heian period) also attest to the worship of the god of Suwa in the capacity of god of warfare at the time of its compilation, naming the shrine of Suwa among famous shrines to martial deities in the eastern half of the country.

During the medieval period, legends claiming Suwa Myōjin to have appeared and provided assistance to eminent figures such as Empress Jingū or the general Sakanoue no Tamuramaro during their respective military campaigns circulated.

The god of Suwa was also credited with the attempted Mongol invasions of Japan under Kublai Khan. The Taiheiki recounts a story where a five-colored cloud resembling a serpent (a manifestation of the god) rose up from Lake Suwa and spread away westward to assist the Japanese army against the Mongols.

On the seventh day, when the Imperial devotions were completed, from Lake Suwa there arose a cloud of many colours, in shape like a great serpent, which spread away towards the west. The doors of the Temple-treasury of Hachiman flew open, and the skies were filled with a sound of galloping horses and of ringing bits. In the twenty-one shrines of Yoshino the brocade-curtained mirrors moved, the swords of the Temple-treasury put on a sharp edge, and all the shoes offered to the god turned towards the west. At Sumiyoshi sweat poured from below the saddles of the four horses sacred to the deities, and the iron shields turned of themselves and faced the enemy in a line.

Analysis

Takeminakata in the Kojiki

Takeminakata's abrupt appearance in the Kojiki's version of the kuni-yuzuri myth has long puzzled scholars, as the god is mentioned nowhere else in the work, including the genealogy of Ōkuninushi's progeny that precedes the kuni-yuzuri narrative proper. Aside from the parallel account contained in the Kuji Hongi (which was itself based on the Kojiki), he is altogether absent from the Nihon Shoki's version of the myth. Early documents from Izumo such as the province's Fudoki also fail to mention any god named '(Take)minakata', nor is there apparently any sign of Takeminakata worship in Izumo in antiquity.

Pre-modern authors such as Motoori Norinaga tended to explain Takeminakata's absence outside of the Kojiki and the Kuji Hongi by conflating the god with certain obscure deities found in other sources thought to share certain similar characteristics (e.g. Isetsuhiko). While a few modern scholars still suppose some kind of indirect connection between the deity and Izumo by postulating that Takeminakata's origins lie either in peoples that migrated from Izumo northwards to Suwa and the Hokuriku region or in Hokuriku itself (the ancient province of Koshi, a region apparently once under Izumo's sphere of influence as can be inferred from the myth of Ōkuninushi's marriage to Nunakawahime), others instead propose that the connection between Takeminakata and Izumo is an artificial construct by the Kojiki's compilers.

The contest between Takeminakata and Takemikazuchi - an element absent in other versions of the kuni-yuzuri myth cycle - is often explained as being either a new myth invented to serve the interests of the imperial court and the Fujiwara clan, descendants of the Nakatomi clan that had worshiped Takemikazuchi as a patron deity (indeed, in other versions it is the god Futsunushi that takes center stage rather than Takemikazuchi, who is believed to have taken on Futsunushi's roles and attributes after the Nakatomi rose to power), or an adaptation/reversal of a myth concerning a battle between an interloping god and a local deity preserved in the Suwa region (see below), with Takeminakata (the invading conqueror in Suwa myth) being recast into the role of the subjugated earthly kami.

Suwa Myōjin and Moriya 

The myth of Takeminakata's (Suwa Myōjin's) arrival in Suwa and his defeat of the god Moriya has been interpreted as the mythicization of a historical event in which a local lineage of chieftains who ruled the Suwa area was subjugated by invading outsiders, who subsequently set themselves up as the new rulers of the region - all the while still retaining the subjugated clan in an important position as the wielder of spiritual and ritual authority. This theory explains the relation between the Suwa (Miwa/Jin) and Moriya priestly families of the Upper Shrine of Suwa as that of the Moriya clan being the regional power supplanted by the newly arrived Miwa (Suwa) clan.

While one theory places this event during the end of the Jōmon period, thus portraying the new arrivals as agrarian Yayoi tribes who came into conflict with indigenous Jōmon hunter-gatherers, others instead propose this conflict to have taken place during the late Kofun period (late 6th-early 7th century), when keyhole-shaped burial mounds containing equestrian gear as grave goods - up to this point found mainly in the Shimoina region southwest of Suwa - begin to appear in the Lake Suwa area, replacing the kind of burial that had been common in the region since the early 5th century. This theory thus supposes these migrants to have been a clan allied with the Yamato kingdom that specialized in horse breeding and horseback riding. Indeed, the Yamato polity showed strong interest to Shinano because of its suitability as a place for grazing and breeding horses and considered it a strategic base for conquering the eastern regions. This clan, the Miwa (Suwa), is thought to be related to either the Kanasashi clan (金刺氏), an offshoot of a local magnate clan (kuni no miyatsuko) that later became the high priestly family of the Lower Shrine of Suwa, or the Miwa (Ōmiwa) clan (三輪氏) originally based on the area around Mount Miwa in Yamato Province. The theory suggests based on archaeological evidence that the Miwa (Suwa) came to the Suwa Basin from Shimoina, making their way northwards along the Tenryū River. In conjunction with this hypothesis, it is pointed out that in the Nobushige Gejō (believed to be the earliest attestation of this myth), the Suwa deity is said to have descended from heaven bringing with him bells, a mirror, a saddle and a bridle.

This theory that the legend of the Suwa deity's victory over Moriya reflects historical fact has recently come into question. Due to similarities between certain variants of this myth and medieval legends surrounding Prince Shōtoku's defeat of Mononobe no Moriya (e.g. Shōtoku's and Suwa Myōjin's opponents both being named 'Moriya', the deity's manifestation and the foundation of the Upper Shrine being dated to the year 587 - the same year as the battle between the Soga and the Mononobe clans - in some texts), some see the myth as being highly influenced by such stories about Shōtoku (so Ihara, 2008), while others regard it as an outright invention modeled on these legends (Harada, 2018). Aoki (2012) theorizes that the myth developed somewhere during the late Heian and early Kamakura periods, when the deity of Suwa came to be venerated as a warrior god, and cautions against uncritical application of this story to known archaeological data.

Takeminakata in imperial sources
While the Kojiki does not yet explicitly mention the worship of Takeminakata in Suwa, by the following century, we see the name applied to the god worshipped in what is now the Grand Shrine of Suwa: aside from the Kuji Hongi's (807-936 CE) reference to Takeminakata being enshrined in 'Suwa Shrine in Suwa District' the Shoku Nihon Kōki mentions the deity 'Minakatatomi-no-Kami of Suwa District, Shinano Province' (信濃国諏訪郡 ... 南方刀美神) being promoted from rankless (无位) to junior fifth rank, lower grade (従五位下) by the imperial court in the year 842 CE (Jōwa 9).

During the 850-60s, Takeminakata and his shrine rose very rapidly in rank (Montoku Jitsuroku, Nihon Sandai Jitsuroku), being promoted to the rank of junior fifth, upper grade (従五位上) in 850 (Kashō 3), to junior third (従三位) in 851 (Ninju 1), to junior (従二位) and then senior second (正二位) in 859 (Jōgan 1), and finally to junior first rank (従一位) in 867 (Jōgan 9). The influence of the Kanasashi-no-toneri clan is thought to be behind the deity's sudden progress in rank.

After a few decades, the 'Register of Deities' (神名帳 Jinmyōchō) section of the Engishiki (927) speaks of the 'Minakatatomi Shrine(s)' (南方刀美神社) as enshrining two deities and being the two major ('eminent') shrines of Suwa district. By 940 (Tengyō 3), the deity had been promoted to the highest rank of senior first (正一位).

Consort and Offspring

Yasakatome

Suwa Myōjin's spouse is the goddess , most often considered to be the deity of the Lower Shrine of Suwa or the Shimosha. Unlike the relatively well-documented Suwa Kamisha, very little concrete information is available regarding the origins of the Shimosha and its goddess.

's first historical attestation is in the Shoku Nihon Kōki, where the goddess is given the rank of junior fifth, lower grade (従五位下) by the imperial court in the tenth month of Jōwa 9 (842 CE), five months after the same rank was conferred on Takeminakata. As Takeminakata rose up in rank, so did Yasakatome, so that by 867 CE, Yasakatome had been promoted to senior second (正二位). The goddess was finally promoted to senior first rank (正一位) in 1074 (Jōhō 1).

Stories and claims about the goddess are diverse and contradictory. Regarding her parentage for instance, the lore of Kawaai Shrine (川会神社) in Kitaazumi District identifies Yasakatome as the daughter of Watatsumi, god of the sea,
which has been seen as hinting to a connection between the goddess and the seafaring Azumi clan (安曇氏). Another claim originating from sources dating from the Edo period is that Yasakatome was the daughter of Ame-no-yasakahiko (天八坂彦命), a god recorded in the Kuji Hongi as one of the companions of Nigihayahi-no-Mikoto when the latter came down from heaven.

The ice cracks that appear on Lake Suwa during cold winters, the omiwatari (see above) are reputed in folklore to be caused by Suwa Myōjin's crossing the frozen lake to visit Yasakatome.

Princess Kasuga

The Kōga Saburō legend identifies the goddess of the Shimosha with Saburō's wife, whose name is given in some variants of the story as 'Princess Kasuga' (春日姫 Kasuga-hime).

Children

In Suwa, a number of local deities are popularly considered to be the children of Suwa Myōjin and his consort. Ōta (1926) lists the following gods:

Hikokamiwake-no-Mikoto (彦神別命)
Tatsuwakahime-no-Kami (多都若姫神)
Taruhime-no-Kami (多留姫神) 
Izuhayao-no-Mikoto (伊豆早雄命)
Tateshina-no-Kami (建志名神)
Tsumashinahime-no-Kami (妻科姫神)
Ikeno'o-no-Kami (池生神)
Tsumayamizuhime-no-mMikoto (都麻屋美豆姫命)
Yakine-no-Mikoto (八杵命)
Suwa-wakahiko-no-Mikoto (洲羽若彦命)
Katakurabe-no-Mikoto (片倉辺命)
Okihagi-no-Mikoto (興波岐命)
Wakemizuhiko-no-Mikoto (別水彦命)
Moritatsu-no-Kami (守達神)
Takamori-no-kami (高杜神)
Enatakemimi-no-Mikoto (恵奈武耳命)
Okutsuiwatate-no-Kami (奥津石建神)
Ohotsuno-no-Kami (竟富角神)
Ōkunugi-no-Kami (大橡神)

Claimed descendants

Suwa clan

The Suwa clan who once occupied the position of head priest or ōhōri of the Suwa Kamisha traditionally considered themselves to be descendants of Suwa Myōjin/Takeminakata, although historically they are probably descended from the Kanasashi-no-toneri clan appointed by the Yamato court to govern the Suwa area in the 6th century (see above).

Other clans

The Suwa ōhōri was assisted by five priests, some of whom were also considered to be descendants of local deities related to Suwa Myōjin/Takeminakata. One clan, the Koide (小出氏), the original occupants of the offices of negi-dayū (禰宜大夫) and gi-no-hōri (擬祝), claimed descent from the god Yakine. A second clan, the Yajima (八島(嶋)氏 or 矢島氏), which served as gon-no-hōri (権祝), considered the god Ikeno'o to be their ancestor.

Worship

Shrines
As the gods of the Grand Shrine of Suwa, Suwa Myōjin/Takeminakata and Yasakatome also serve as the deities of shrines belonging to the Suwa shrine network (諏訪神社 Suwa-jinja) all over Japan.

As god of wind and water

The Nihon Shoki's record of Yamato emissaries worshipping the god of Suwa alongside the gods of Tatsuta Shrine - worshipped for their power to control and ward off wind-related disasters such as droughts and typhoons - implies that the Yamato imperial court recognized the deity as a god of wind and water during the late 7th century. One theory regarding the origin of the name '(Take)minakata' even supposes it to derive from a word denoting a body of water (水潟 minakata; see above).

Snake-shaped iron sickle blades called nagikama (薙鎌) were traditionally used in the Suwa region to ward off strong winds, typhoons and other natural disasters; it was once customary for nagikama to be attached to wooden staves and placed on one corner of the rooftop of the house during the autumn typhoon season. Nagikama are also traditionally hammered onto the trees chosen to become the onbashira of the Suwa Kamisha and Shimosha some time before these are actually felled. In addition to these and other uses, the blades are also distributed to function as shintai for branch shrines of the Suwa shrine network.

Association with snakes and dragons

Suwa Myōjin's association with the snake or the dragon in many stories featuring the god such as the Kōga Saburō legend (see 'Legends of Suwa Myōjin' above) might be related to his being considered as a deity presiding over wind and water, due to the association of dragons with winds and the rain in Japanese belief. (See also mizuchi.)

Under shinbutsu-shūgō

During the Middle Ages, under the then-prevalent synthesis of Buddhism and Shinto, Suwa Myōjin was identified with the bodhisattva Samantabhadra (Fugen), with the goddess of the Shimosha being associated with the thousand-armed form of the bodhisattva Avalokiteśvara (Senju Kannon). During the medieval period, Buddhist temples and other edifices were erected on the precincts of both shrines, including a stone pagoda called the Tettō (鉄塔 "iron tower") - symbolizing the legendary iron tower in India where, according to Shingon tradition, Nagarjuna was said to have received esoteric teachings from Vajrasattva (who is sometimes identified with Samantabhadra) - and a sanctuary to Samantabhadra (普賢堂 Fugendō), both of which served at the time as the Kamisha's main objects of worship.

With the establishment of State Shinto after the Meiji Restoration in 1868 and the subsequent separation of Buddhism and Shinto, the shrine monks (shasō) attached to Buddhist temples in the Suwa shrine complex were laicized, with Buddhist symbols and structures being either removed or destroyed; Buddhist ceremonies performed in both the Kamisha and the Shimosha, such as the yearly offering of the Lotus Sutra to Suwa Myōjin (involving the placing of a copy of the sutra inside the Tettō), were discontinued.

As god of hunting

Suwa Myōjin is also worshipped as a god of hunting; not surprisingly, some of the Kamisha's religious ceremonies traditionally involve(d) ritual hunting and/or animal sacrifice.

For instance, the Frog Hunting Ritual (蛙狩神事 kawazugari shinji) held every New Year's Day involves the shooting (or rather, piercing) of frogs captured from a sacred river or stream within the Kamisha's precincts with miniature arrows. This ritual - which has come under harsh criticism from local activists and animal rights groups for its perceived cruelty to the frogs involved - was traditionally performed to secure peace and a bountiful harvest for the coming year.

Another festival, the Ontōsai (御頭祭) or the Tori no matsuri (酉の祭, so called because it was formerly held on the Day of the Rooster) currently held every April 15, feature the offering of seventy-five stuffed deer heads (a substitute for freshly cut heads of deer used in the past), as well as the consumption of venison and other game such as wild boar or rabbit, various kinds of seafood and other foodstuffs by the priests and other participants in a ritual banquet.

One of the Suwa Kamisha's hunting festivals, the Misayama Festival (御射山祭), formerly held in a field - the kōya (神野 'the god's plain') - at the foot of the Yatsugatake Mountains for five days (from the 26th to the 30th of the seventh month), was one of the grandest festivals in Suwa during the Kamakura period, attracting many of the samurai class from all across Japan who engaged in displays of mounted archery, bouts of sumo wrestling and falconry as part of the festivities, as well as people from all walks of life. The Shimosha also held its own Misayama Festival at the same time as the Kamisha (albeit in a different location), in which various warrior clans also participated.

Suwa Myōjin's association with the mountains and hunting is also evident from the description of the ōhōri as sitting upon a deer hide (the deer being an animal thought to be sacred to Suwa Myōjin) during the Ontōsai ritual as practiced during medieval times.

Suwa Myōjin and meat eating

At a time when slaughter of animals and consumption of meat was frowned upon due to Mahayana Buddhism's strict views on vegetarianism and the general Buddhist opposition against the taking of life, the cult of Suwa Myōjin was a unique feature in the Japanese religious landscape for its celebration of hunting and meat eating.

A four-line verse attached to the Kōga Saburō legend popularly known as the Suwa no kanmon (諏訪の勘文) encapsulates the justification of meat eating within a Buddhist framework: by being eaten by humans and 'dwelling' inside their bodies, ignorant animals could achieve enlightenment together with their human consumers.

The Kamisha produced special talismans (鹿食免 kajiki-men "permit to eat venison") and chopsticks (鹿食箸 kajiki-bashi) that were held to allow the bearer to eat meat. Since it was the only one of its kind in Japan, the talisman was popular among hunters and meat eaters. These sacred licenses and chopsticks were distributed to the public both by the priests of the Kamisha as well as wandering preachers associated with the shrine known as oshi (御師), who preached the tale of Suwa Myōjin as Kōga Saburō as well as other stories concerning the god and his benefits.

As war god

Suwa Myōjin is also considered to be a god of war, one of a number of such deities in the Japanese pantheon. Besides the legend of the god's apparition to Sakanoue no Tamuramaro (see above), the Ryōjin Hishō compiled in 1179 (the late Heian period) also attest to the worship of the god of Suwa in the capacity of god of warfare at the time of its compilation, naming the shrine of Suwa among famous shrines to martial deities in the eastern half of the country.

During the Kamakura period, the Suwa clan's association with the shogunate and the Hōjō clan helped further cement Suwa Myōjin's reputation as a martial deity. The shrines of Suwa and the priestly clans thereof flourished under the patronage of the Hōjō, which promoted devotion to the god as a sign of loyalty to the shogunate. Suwa branch shrines became numerous all across Japan, especially in territories held by clans devoted to the god (for instance, the Kantō region, traditional stronghold of the Minamoto (Seiwa Genji) clan).

The Takeda clan of Kai Province (modern Yamanashi Prefecture) were devotees of Suwa Myōjin, its most famous member, the Sengoku daimyō Takeda Shingen being no exception. His devotion is visibly evident in some of his war banners, which bore the god's name and invocations such as Namu Suwa Nangū Hosshō Kamishimo Daimyōjin (南無諏方南宮法性上下大明神 'Namo Dharma-Nature Daimyōjin of the Suwa Upper and Lower Shrines'). The iconic horned helmet with the flowing white hair commonly associated with Shingen, popularly known as the Suwa-hosshō helmet (諏訪法性兜 Suwa-hosshō-(no)-kabuto), came to be reputed in some popular culture retellings to have been blessed by the god, guaranteeing success in battle to its wearer. Shingen also issued an order for the reinstitution of the religious rites of both the Kamisha and the Shimosha in 1565.

See also
 Moreya
 Mishaguji
 Takemikazuchi
 Suwa taisha
 Onbashira Festival
 Ōkuninushi
 Snake worship
 Suwa Daimyōjin Ekotoba

Notes

References

Bibliography

 

 

 
 
Inoue, Takami (2003). "The Interaction between Buddhist and Shinto Traditions at Suwa Shrine." In 
 
 
 
 
 
 
 
 

 
 
Suwa, Enchū. Suwa Daimyōjin Ekotoba, in

External links
Official website of Suwa Grand Shrine 
Official website of Moriya Shrine (洩矢神社公式HP) 
Jinchōkan Moriya Historical Museum  on Chino City's official website 

Agricultural gods
Hunting gods
Japanese deities
Japanese mythology
Legendary serpents
Nature gods
Shinto
Shinto kami
Sky and weather gods
War gods
Wind gods
Suwa faith
Kunitsukami